The Church of Jesus Christ of Latter-day Saints in Croatia refers to the Church of Jesus Christ of Latter-day Saints (LDS Church) and its members in Croatia. The first missionaries arrived in Croatia in 1974. In 2021, there were 637 members in 6 congregations.

History 

Krešimir Ćosić was baptized in 1971 while studying and playing for Brigham Young University. He rejected his 1973 draft with the Los Angeles Lakers and returned to Yugoslavia to play and coach basketball in 1974. He won many of Basketball's highest recognitions during his college and professional career. Throughout his career, Ćosić would openly talk about the LDS Church. He served in local church leadership roles while in Croatia.

The first sacrament meeting was held in Zadar on September 11, 1972. The Zadar Branch, Croatia's first, was organized in 1974. The LDS Church gained legal recognition by the Yugoslav government in 1975. A limited number of North American missionaries served in Yugoslavia on limited assignments in the late 1970s. In 1981, the first full-time missionary called from Yugoslavia, Radmila Ranović, started his mission. He was called to serve in the Canada Montréal Mission. In 1982, the Zagreb Branch was organized. President Thomas S. Monson dedicated Croatia for missionary work on October 31, 1985, in Zagreb. Through much of the 1980s, missionaries were only permitted to speak about the Church if they were first asked by a potential investigator. In April 1987, Russell M. Nelson and other church leaders met with government authorities and received verbal permission for missionaries to openly proselytize in Croatia. The LDS Church received official government recognition in September 1987. Seminary began in 1997. On May 25, 2008, a major public square in Zagreb was named after Krešimir Ćosić. Institute began in 2008.

On May 24, 2009, Elder D. Todd Christofferson of the Quorum of the Twelve Apostles dedicated the newly constructed Zagreb meetinghouse. This was the first Church-constructed meetinghouse in Croatia. In May 2012, Young Women in Croatia attended young women camp for the first time. More than 375 people attended a commemoration celebrating 40 years since the beginning of Ćosić's efforts to establish the LDS Church in Yugoslavia on June 1–2, 2012.

Humanitarian Efforts
The Church has conducted 161 humanitarian projects since 1985 that have included activities such as clean water initiatives, community projects, emergency response, refugee response, and wheelchair donations. Most recent projects have focused on refugees. Large amounts of humanitarian aid were donated from 1991 to 1992 due to war in the region. Between 1993 and 1998, the LDS Church provided thousands of tons of food, clothing, bedding and medical supplies to Croatia. In 1997, missionaries Vernon and Muriel Smith launched a project to help struggling farmers in the Sisak region reestablish the local pork industry. In 1999, the Church donated 130 pigs to needy refugee families to replenish their lost livestock. In 2002, Church members in the Netherlands donated quilts and toys to orphanages in Croatia and Slovakia. In 2003, the Church began planting 1,450 fruit trees at an elementary school in Ratkovac to help increase self-sufficiency.

Districts and Congregations 

As of February 2023, Croatia had the following district and congregations:

Zagreb Croatia District
Karlovac Branch
Osijek Branch
Rijeka Branch
Split Branch
Zadar Branch
Zagreb Branch

Congregations not part of a stake are called branches, regardless of size.

Missions
Prior to 1987, any missionary activity was performed under the Austria Vienna Mission. The Austria Vienna East Mission was organized on July 1, 1987, and administered to Yugoslavia among other former soviet countries. On July 1, 1996, the Austria Vienna South Mission was created and administered the former Yugoslavia. Mission headquarters were relocated to Slovenia in 1999 and renamed the Slovenia Ljubljana Mission. On January 9, 2003, the mission home and office was relocated to Croatia and became the Croatia Zagreb Mission. In the early 2010s, the Adriatic North Mission headquarters was relocated to Zagreb, Croatia. As of February 2023, the Mission covers missionary efforts in Bosnia and Herzegovina, Croatia, Montenegro, Serbia. and Slovenia.

Bosnia and Herzegovina
The LDS Church reported 67 members in 2 congregations in Bosnia and Herzegovina for year-end 2021. These congregations are located in Banja Luka and Sarajevo.

Montenegro
The LDS Church reported 30 members in Montenegro for year-end 2021. The Podgorica Branch is the only congregation meeting in Montenegro and is part of the Beograd Serbia District. A family history center is also located in the Podgorica meetinghouse.

Serbia
The LDS Church reported 361 members in 3 congregations as well as 2 family history centers in Serbia for year-end 2021. These congregations are part of the Beograd Serbia District which includes the Beograd Branch, Novi Sad Branch and Sremska Mitrovica Branch in Serbia as well as the Podgorica Branch in Montenegro. The family history centers are located in Beograd and Novi Sad.

Slovenia
The LDS Church reported 449 members in 2 congregations in Slovenia for year-end 2021. These congregations are part of the Ljubljana Slovenia District which includes the Ljubljana Branch and Maribor Branch. A family history center is located in Ljubljana.

Temples
There are no temples in Croatia. As of February 2022, Croatia was located in the Frankfurt Germany Temple district. Church President Russell M. Nelson has announced that a temple will be built in Vienna, Austria and Budapest, Hungary which, once completed, will reduce the travel time and cost needed to attend a temple.

See also

Religion in Croatia

References

External links
 The Church of Jesus Christ of Latter-day Saints - Croatia - Official Site (Croatian)
 ComeUntoChrist.org Latter-day Saints Visitor site

 
Christianity in Croatia